Alienoid Starmonica was the first release for The Aliens, a band hailing from Fife, Scotland. It is an EP, released on 8 May 2006.

Background
The Aliens formed from the ashes of The Beta Band in 2005, reuniting Robin Jones and John Maclean with Gordon Anderson (aka Lone Pigeon), a former bandmate who left the Betas due to mental illness. This, their first release, reworks some songs from earlier Lone Pigeon releases as well as including some new material.

The track "Robot Man" is also included in their debut studio album Astronomy for Dogs.

Track listing
All tracks except "Hey Leanne" by Gordon Anderson and The Aliens.
 "Hey Leanne" (written by Gordon Anderson)
 "Only Waiting"
 "Robot Man"
 "Ionas (Look For Space)"

Personnel
Gordon Anderson – vocals, guitar, piano, synths, Hammond organ ("Only Waiting")
Robin Jones – drums, percussion
John Maclean – keyboard, Hammond organ ("Robot Man"), bass

Additional
EEn Anderson – pedal steel guitar, double bass ("Hey Leanne")
Scruffy the Dog – barks ("Hey Leanne")
Marbles (the Cat) – purrs ("Hey Leanne")
John Williamson – end bass ("Robot Man"), Hammond organ ("Ionas (Look For Space)"

Production
Recorded by John Williamson
Produced by The Aliens
Mixed by Guy Fixson

Notes
The song "Hey Leanne" is wordplay on 'Alien'. The track is heavily psychedelic, phasing and using many strange noises and borrowing from other pieces, notably Music of the Crucifixion.

"Robot Man" is included on Astronomy for Dogs twice, once as it is and once in the form of "Rox", a slower, synth-laden version.

References

2006 debut EPs
The Aliens (Scottish band) albums